This is a list of German television related events from 1995.

Events
30 December - Debut of Soundmix Show, a series hosted by Linda de Mol in which members of the public impersonate their favourite singers.

Debuts

Free for air

Domestic
2 January - Verbotene Liebe (1995–2015) (Das Erste)
20 February - Wilsberg (1995–present) (Das Erste)
19 March -  (1995) (Sat.1)
4 May - Deutschlandlied (1995) (Arte)
16 September - Gottschalks Hausparty (1995–1997)
20 November -  (1995) (ZDF)
24 December - Der Räuber mit der sanften Hand (1995) (RTL)
30 December - Soundmix Show (1995–1997)

International
21 April -  The Shoe People (1987) (RTL II)
24 April -  Seinfeld (1989–1998) (kabel eins)
28 April - / Dog City (1992–1994) (ZDF)
8 October -  The Tick (1994–1996) (ProSieben)
22 October -  Touched by an Angel (1994–2003) (RTL II)
30 October -  ER (1994–2009) (ProSieben)
30 December - / Oscar's Orchestra (1995–2000) (ZDF)

Cable

International
July -  Rugrats (1991-2004) (Nickelodeon)

Armed Forces Network
 Animaniacs (1993-1998)
 Barney & Friends (1992-2010)
/ Dog City (1992-1994)
// Secret Life of Toys (1994)

BFBS
 Oakie Doke (1995-1996)
// Magic Adventures of Mumfie (1994-1999)

Changes of network affiliation

Television shows

1950s
Tagesschau (1952–present)

1960s
 heute (1963-present)

1970s
 heute-journal (1978-present)
 Tagesthemen (1978-present)

1980s
Wetten, dass..? (1981-2014)
Lindenstraße (1985–present)

1990s
Gute Zeiten, schlechte Zeiten (1992–present)
Marienhof (1992–2011)
Unter uns (1994-present)

See also
1995 in Germany